Joaquín de Jesús Caparrós Camino (born 15 October 1955) is a Spanish football manager.

After winning the Segunda División with Sevilla in 2001, Caparrós was a regular on the La Liga sidelines for the best part of two decades. He coached Sevilla, Deportivo de La Coruña, Athletic Bilbao, Mallorca, Levante, Granada and Osasuna in the top flight. He had brief spells in Switzerland and Qatar, and also managed the Armenia national team for two years.

Football career

Early career
Caparrós was born in Utrera, Province of Seville, Andalusia. After an obscure career as a player, he started coaching in his mid-20s, his first club being amateurs San José Obrero CF. The first professional spell came at local Recreativo de Huelva, which he helped reach Segunda División in the second of his three years.

Caparrós began the 1999–2000 season on Villarreal CF's bench, lasting only seven games; his successor Paquito guided the Valencians to La Liga in third place. He also co-managed the Andalusia autonomous team with José Enrique Díaz for two friendlies in the late 1990s.

Sevilla
On 25 May 2000, Caparrós was unveiled as the new Sevilla FC manager. He ended their one-year top-flight exile in his first season at the Ramón Sánchez Pizjuán Stadium, winning the second division.

With youth products such as Carlos Marchena, José Antonio Reyes and Jesuli – Sergio Ramos soon followed – and the future signings of Júlio Baptista, Adriano, Daniel Alves and Renato, Caparrós set the foundations for future domestic and European success, but was replaced by Juande Ramos before any of the actual conquests.

Deportivo and Athletic
In the summer of 2005, Caparrós moved to Deportivo de La Coruña, being fired after a poor second season. He was appointed at Athletic Bilbao afterwards, beating former club Sevilla in the semi-finals of the 2008–09 edition of the Copa del Rey (4–2 aggregate) and qualifying for the UEFA Europa League as FC Barcelona won the treble.
 
Caparrós led the Lions to the sixth position in the 2010–11 campaign, once again qualifying for the Europa League. On 7 July 2011, after his contract expired – the club also underwent a chairman change after an election – he left Athletic Bilbao, being replaced by Argentine Marcelo Bielsa.

Foreign stints and return to La Liga
On 27 July 2011, Caparrós accepted a one-year offer from Swiss Super League team Neuchâtel Xamax FCS, who had sacked François Ciccolini after losing the first two games of the campaign. He resigned after just five matches, following a disagreement with owner Bulat Chagaev. On 3 October, RCD Mallorca vice-president Lorenzo Serra Ferrer announced that the Balearic Islands side had reached an agreement with the manager.

On 4 February 2013, after a promising start of the season, with three home wins and two away draws in the first five rounds, Caparrós was relieved of his duties as Mallorca ranked second-bottom. His last game in charge was a 3–0 away loss against Real Sociedad.

Caparrós was given a two-year contract extension on 23 May 2014, after finishing his debut campaign with Levante UD in tenth position. However, the following week, he left and joined Granada CF of the same league.

On 16 January 2015, as Granada ranked last in the table and had just been ousted from the domestic cup by Sevilla (6–1 on aggregate), Caparrós was relieved of his duties. He returned to work in early November of the following year, replacing the sacked Enrique Martín at the helm of CA Osasuna but being himself dismissed on 5 January 2017 after seven losses in as many league games.

On 2 June 2017, Caparrós left Europe for the first time in his career to manage Qatari club Al Ahli SC (Doha). He resigned on 27 December, citing personal reasons.

Sevilla return
Caparrós returned to Sevilla on 28 April 2018 following the dismissal of Vincenzo Montella, being appointed caretaker manager until the end of the season. In May, after the signing of Pablo Machín as his successor, he was named the club's director of football. 

On 15 March 2019, Caparrós again took over as caretaker until the end of the season following the dismissal of Machín after only ten months in charge, after Sevilla were knocked out of the Europa League round of 16 by SK Slavia Prague.

Armenia
Caparrós moved into international coaching on 10 March 2020, signing with Armenia until 30 November 2021. On his debut on 5 September, the side lost 2–1 away to North Macedonia in the UEFA Nations League. On 18 November, after a 1–0 win against the same opponent, his team won their group and were promoted.

On 28 June 2021, Caparrós' contract was extended until the end of 2022. In his final game on 27 September, Armenia were relegated back to the third tier of the Nations League after a 3–2 loss away to the Republic of Ireland, settled by a penalty kick awarded for handball in added time; his deal with the Football Federation of Armenia was mutually terminated two days later. During his spell, the team achieved the longest unbeaten run in its history, nine games.

Managerial statistics

Honours
Sevilla
Segunda División: 2000–01

Individual
Armenian Coach of the Year: 2020, 2021

References

External links

Athletic Bilbao manager profile

1955 births
Living people
People from Utrera
Sportspeople from the Province of Seville
Spanish footballers
Footballers from Andalusia
Association footballers not categorized by position
Real Madrid Castilla footballers
CD Leganés players
UB Conquense footballers
Spanish football managers
La Liga managers
Segunda División managers
Segunda División B managers
Tercera División managers
UB Conquense managers
Recreativo de Huelva managers
Villarreal CF managers
Sevilla FC managers
Deportivo de La Coruña managers
Athletic Bilbao managers
RCD Mallorca managers
Levante UD managers
Granada CF managers
CA Osasuna managers
Swiss Super League managers
Neuchâtel Xamax FCS managers
Qatar Stars League managers
Al Ahli SC (Doha) managers
Armenia national football team managers
Spanish expatriate football managers
Expatriate football managers in Switzerland
Expatriate football managers in Qatar
Expatriate football managers in Armenia
Spanish expatriate sportspeople in Switzerland
Spanish expatriate sportspeople in Qatar
Spanish expatriate sportspeople in Armenia